Robert George Hofman (October 5, 1925 – April 5, 1994) was an American infielder, catcher and coach in Major League Baseball. Born in St. Louis, Missouri, Hofman threw and batted right-handed, and stood 5'11" (180 cm) tall and weighed 175 pounds (79 kg). His early baseball career was interrupted by service in the United States Army during World War II, where he saw action in the European Theater.

Life and career
Hofman's seven-year MLB playing career (1949; 1952–57) was spent entirely with the New York Giants. His managers, Leo Durocher and Bill Rigney, used Hofman in a utilityman role and as a right-handed pinch hitter off the Giant bench. Over the course of his National League career, he would appear in 86 games at second base, 49 games at first base, 45 contests as a third baseman, and 26 as a catcher. Overall, he appeared in 341 games, batting .248 with 32 home runs in 670 at bats.

From 1958 through 1965, Hofman managed in minor league baseball with the San Francisco Giants and Kansas City Athletics organizations. In , former teammate Alvin Dark (the starting shortstop for most of Hofman's tenure with the Giants) was named manager of the Athletics, and he added Hofman to his coaching staff. Hofman would go on to coach in the American League for 12 seasons (1966–72; 1974–78) with the Athletics in both Kansas City and Oakland, the Washington Senators and Cleveland Indians. He was a coach, under Dark, on Oakland's 1974 world championship team. After his coaching career, Hofman briefly was Oakland's traveling secretary and, during the 1980s, he served as director of scouting and player development of the New York Yankees. He also managed the Richmond Braves for part of the 1973 season, and overall he compiled a record of 574 victories and 599 defeats (.489) as a minor league pilot.

Hofman died of cancer in Chesterfield, Missouri, at the age of 68.

References

External links

 Retrosheet.org
 Obituary, from The Dead Ball Era

1925 births
1994 deaths
Baseball players from St. Louis
Cleveland Indians coaches
Deaths from cancer in Missouri
Kansas City Athletics coaches
Major League Baseball catchers
Major League Baseball infielders
Major League Baseball third base coaches
Minneapolis Millers (baseball) players
Minor league baseball managers
New York Giants (NL) players
New York Yankees executives
Oakland Athletics coaches
Oakland Oaks (baseball) players
Ottawa Giants players
Sioux City Soos players
Springfield Giants (Ohio) players
Trenton Giants players
United States Army personnel of World War II
Washington Senators (1961–1971) coaches